Alain Boudet (1 August 1950 – 24 August 2021) was a French poet and professor.

Biography
Boudet was a professor of humanities with the Ministry of National Education. Several of his books were chosen for 100 livres pour les écoles, a selection of 100 books by the Ministry of National Education. In 1981, he founded Donner à voir, which became a publishing house for contemporary poetry. He also founded Les Amis des printemps poétiques, a poetry festival which has taken place in La Suze-sur-Sarthe since 1984.

Boudet recorded two CDs of contemporary poetry: Le Promenoir vert, which was composed of 600 works of poetry by 150 poets, and Le Petit Promenoir, which contained 150 poems by 50 poets. His website, La Toile de l'un, was devoted to poetry and its audiences.
Boudet recorded two CDs of contemporary poetry: Le Promenoir vert, which was composed of 600 works of poetry by 150 poets, and Le Petit Promenoir, which contained 150 poems by 50 poets. His website, La Toile de l'un, was devoted to poetry and its audiences.

Alain Boudet died on 24 August 2021, at the age of 71.

Works
Mots de saison
Drôles d'oiseaux. 17 poèmes à chanter, 19 poèmes à lire
Marie-Madeleine va-t-à la fontaine
Marie-Madeleine nettoie sa baleine
Une baleine dans mon jardin
Mots de la mer et des étoiles
Comme le ciel dans la mer
Quelques mots pour la solitude
La Volière de Marion
Au jardin d'Hélène
Des mots pour vivre
Au cœur, le poème
Les Mots du paysage
Anne-Laure à fleur d'enfance
Sur le rivage
Quelques instants d'elles
Poèmes pour sourigoler
Poèmes pour sautijouer
Ici, là
Le Rire des cascades
Carrés de l'hypothalamus
Bribes du Sud
Haïku de soleil
Les Mots des mois
Suite pour Nathan
Si peu, mais quelques mots
Pleine lune et bout de soie
Ici là, sur le rivage
Rêves de la main
Roissy
Dépaysés

References

1950 births
2021 deaths
French poets
French academics
People from Le Mans